Borysewicz is a surname of Polish-language origin. It may refer to:

 Eddie Borysewicz (born 1939), Polish cycling coach
 Jan Borysewicz (born 1955), Polish musician and co-founder of Lady Pank

See also
Barysevich (surname)

Polish-language surnames
Patronymic surnames
Surnames from given names